Back to Back or back-to-back may refer to:

Music

Songs 

"Back to Back" (Drake song), 2015
"Back to Back" (Jeanne Pruett song), 1979
"Back to Back", a song by Pretty Maids from the 1984 album Red Hot and Heavy
"Back to Back", a song by Deep Purple from the 2005 album Rapture of the Deep

Albums
Back to Back: Duke Ellington and Johnny Hodges Play the Blues, a 1959 album by Duke Ellington and Johnny Hodges
Back to Back (The Mar-Keys and Booker T. & the M.G.'s album), 1967
Back to Back (Status Quo album), 1983 
Back to Back (Heard Ranier Ferguson album), 1987
Back to Back (Brecker Brothers album), 1976
Back to Back, a 1965 album by The Righteous Brothers
Back to Back, a 1996 album by Lee Greenwood
Back to Back: Raw & Uncut, a 2008 album by Method Man and Streetlife

Films
Back to Back (1996 film), a 1996 film starring Michael Rooker and Ryo Ishibashi
Back to back film production, the practice of making two films as a unified production

Other
Back-to-back connection, two types of direct connections in telecommunications or a type of connection in electric power transmission
Back-to-back home runs, home runs hit by consecutive batters in baseball
Back-to-back house, a form of terraced house, common in Victorian English inner city areas, in which two houses share a rear wall
Birmingham Back to Backs, the last surviving court of back-to-back houses in Birmingham, England
Back-to-back life sentences, a judicial practice where a felon is sentenced to two consecutive life terms in prison
Back to back ticketing, a booking ploy used by travelers in commercial aviation to lower the costs of flying to a desired destination
Back-to-back user agent, the user agent to both ends of a Session Initiation Protocol call
"Back to Back", the nickname of American professional poker player Layne Flack

See also
BB (disambiguation)